This article refers to Sports broadcasting contracts in Canada. For broadcasting rights lists of other countries, see Sports television broadcast contracts.

Athletics
 World Athletics: CBC Sports
 Boston Marathon: TSN
 London Marathon: FloSports
 Rome Marathon: FloSports
 Super League Triathlon: FloSports
 Great North Run: FloSports

Australian-rules football
 Australian Football League: TSN2, TSN.ca, RDS2, RDS.ca and WatchAFL

Baseball

Major League Baseball
 Sportsnet, as its parent company Rogers Communications is the owner of its sole Canadian franchise, the Toronto Blue Jays, holds national rights to Major League Baseball in Canada, including assorted games from U.S. regional sports networks, the MLB All-Star Game, and the postseason (although coverage of the latter two are relegated to MLB's U.S. broadcast partners, and MLB International). Games air across Sportsnet and its sister national services Sportsnet One and Sportsnet 360. Select Blue Jays and other U.S. teams' games can be broadcast on TVA Sports (Sportsnet's French-language partner).
 Rights to ESPN's Monday Night Baseball, Wednesday Night Baseball, and Sunday Night Baseball are held by TSN and RDS (French)
 In French, postseason games are equally split between RDS and TVA Sports. The World Series is on RDS.
 Games available on U.S. over-the-air channels available in Canada on cable or satellite, such as national games on Fox, and local coverage on superstations such as WPIX (New York Yankees and New York Mets, occasionally via Buffalo and/or Rochester network affiliates as well), KTLA-TV (selected Los Angeles Dodgers games). MLB Network is also available on some providers.
The MLB Extra Innings subscription package is available through most Canadian television providers, as well as MLB.tv.
Apple, beginning in 2022, broadcast two games a week as part of their Friday Night Baseball offering on AppleTV+.

International 

 KBO League: TSN (sub-licensed from ESPN)

Basketball

National Basketball Association
The NBA's Canadian marketing arm is managed by Maple Leaf Sports & Entertainment, parent company of the Toronto Raptors. In turn, MLSE is majority-owned by Bell Canada and Rogers Communications; as such, coverage is mostly shared between their co-owned TSN and Sportsnet networks, along with the MLSE-owned NBA TV Canada. Toronto Raptors games are primarily aired by TSN, TSN2 and RDS, with selected games airing on Sportsnet, Sportsnet One, or Sportsnet 360. Ancillary Raptors content, including game encores, air on NBA TV Canada.

All broadcasters air assorted non-Raptors games throughout the season (TSN promoted that it would air 148 regular-season games in total during the 2017–18 season); NBA TV Canada typically airs selected games and simulcasts of games from U.S. broadcasters (most often from its U.S. counterpart). All remaining games are available through the NBA League Pass out-of-market sports package.

TSN and NBA TV have the Canadian TV rights to broadcast the NBA Summer League and NBA G League.

TSN, Sportsnet and NBA TV have the Canadian TV rights to broadcast the WNBA.

U.S. college basketball
TSN owns the Canadian broadcast rights to the NCAA Division I men's basketball tournament through a deal with ESPN International. CBS coverage of the tournament is also available in Canada. TSN also simulcasts regular-season games from ESPN.

Coverage of games is also available from U.S. networks carried in Canada, such as Big Ten Network and CBS Sports Network, along with broadcast network coverage. An out-of-market sports package offered by some providers includes other games from U.S. outlets that are not otherwise available in Canada.

International basketball
DAZN holds broadcast rights to the Canadian national men's basketball team and FIBA tournaments. TSN holds the broadcast rights to the Basketball Africa League.

Canadian basketball
CEBL: TSN and RDS

Cricket
Asian Television Network owns the vast majority of Canadian cricket rights, with marquee events typically airing live on CBN, and selected events and other programming airing on ATN Cricket Plus. ATN also owns the rights to the ICC Cricket World Cup, this tournament is broadcast on pay-per-view throughout Canada.

International cricket
ICC Cricket World Cup: ATN, Hotstar
ACC Asia Cup: Hotstar
India home matches: Hotstar
England home matches: WillowTV
Pakistan home matches: WillowTV
Sri Lanka home matches: SonyLIV
West Indies home matches: CBN & ATN Cricket Plus
Australia home matches: CBN & ATN Cricket Plus
New Zealand home matches: CBN & ATN Cricket Plus
Bangladesh home matches: WillowTV
South Africa home matches: WillowTV
Zimbabwe home matches: WillowTV

Domestic cricket
Indian Premier League: Times Internet
Global T20 Canada: CBN, TSN
Big Bash League: CBN
Royal London One-Day Cup: Willow TV
Caribbean Premier League T20: Willow TV
Pakistan Super League: Willow TV
The Hundred: Willow TV
Lanka Premier League: Willow TV

Curling
 Curling Canada: 
 Tim Hortons Brier: TSN and RDS
 Scotties Tournament of Hearts: TSN and RDS
 Canada Cup of Curling: TSN and RDS
 Continental Cup of Curling: TSN and RDS
 World Curling Championships: TSN and RDS
 Olympic Trials (Men's and women's): TSN and RDS
 Olympic Trials (Mixed doubles): CBC Sports
 European Curling Championships: TSN
 Grand Slam of Curling: Sportsnet, CBC
 Provincial championships:
 Alberta: Sportsnet
 British Columbia: CBC Sports
 Manitoba: Sportsnet
 Ontario: Title Sports Live
 Saskatchewan: SaskTel, CurlSask YouTube

Cycling
Tour de France, Vuelta a Espana & other ASO races: FloSports 
Flanders Classics, Amstel Gold Race races: FloSports 
Giro d'Italia and other RCS races: GCN+

Extreme sports
 X Games: TSN
 Street League Skateboarding: YouTube

Golf
 TSN and RDS holds rights to all four of the Men's major golf championships—the Masters Tournament, the U.S. Open and other USGA tournaments, the Open Championship (weekend rounds) and other R&A tournaments, and the PGA Championship. Both channels also broadcast the biennial tournaments: Presidents Cup and Ryder Cup. Other events include the Augusta National Women's Amateur, Senior PGA Championship, Asia-Pacific Amateur Championship and Latin America Amateur Championship.
 U.S. network coverage of the Masters and Open Championship are simulcast by CTV for simsub purposes.
 Golf Channel is available on Canadian television providers, and the majority of its programming, including early-round coverage of PGA Tour events, the European Tour, and LPGA, is carried in the country without blackouts.
 Golf Channel's Canadian feed also continues to carry early-round coverage of the Open Championship despite that coverage having moved to USA Network in the U.S.
 TSN and CTV 2 carry weekend round coverage of selected PGA Tour events. 
 RDS carries live coverage of PGA Tour events carried by U.S. network television (weekend rounds).
 After the closure of the streaming service GolfTV in December 2022, TSN announced the acquisition of rights to PGA TOUR LIVE, featuring more than 4,300 hours of exclusive coverage from PGA TOUR events throughout the season through TSN+, an all-new direct-to-consumer streaming product.
CHCH carries weekend coverage of the LIV Golf series.

Gridiron football

Canadian football

Canadian Football League
TSN – all games including playoffs and Grey Cup
RDS – all Montreal and all Ottawa games, as well as select additional games throughout the season, the playoffs and the Grey Cup.

Canadian university football
As of 2019, CBC Sports and TVA Sports broadcasts the national U Sports playoff games, namely the Mitchell Bowl, the Uteck Bowl, and the Vanier Cup, succeeding Sportsnet (who aired it from 2013 to 2018).

TVA Sports carries many QSSF games. In 2016, Sportsnet's sister broadcast network City began broadcasting a four-game U Sports Game of the Week package. Games not covered by these contracts are often carried by local cable community channels.

In 2015, Global aired a Hardy Trophy semi-final and championship game as part of the Shaw TV (Shaw Cable) Canada West conference package (at the time, Shaw directly owned Global). As of the 2017–18 season, Canada West conference rights are held by the three major IPTV providers in Central Canada—Bell MTS Fibe TV, SaskTel MaxTV and Telus TV (including a regular season package and playoff coverage).

American football

National Football League
Contracts are current as of the 2020 NFL season.

CTV – Sunday afternoon games, most playoff games, and the Super Bowl.
TSN – Sunday afternoon games. Airs all primetime game packages, including Sunday Night Football, Monday Night Football, and Thursday Night Football. Additional Sunday afternoon games, and playoff games interfering with other major events carried on CTV, may air on one or more of the TSN feeds. 
Through its relationship with the network, TSN also carries ESPN's NFL studio programming, including NFL Live, Sunday NFL Countdown, and Monday Night Countdown.
CTV2 simulcasts Sunday Night Football and Thursday Night Football games with TSN.
NFL RedZone is available via TSN for TV Everywhere and TSN Direct subscribers.
RDS / RDS2 – French-language coverage.
DAZN – NFL Game Pass and streaming of all games, NFL Network, NFL RedZone, and additional archive content, as part of its service.  DAZN also distributes the NFL Sunday Ticket service in Canada; while DAZN initially planned to only distribute a digital out-of-market product in Canada, the company backtracked and revived Sunday Ticket following user complaints over the quality of its streams.

Due to Canadian regulations that permit stations from different areas to be carried in the same market, several games may be available in each of the Sunday timeslots through a combination of domestic and American stations from different areas, without a subscription to Sunday Ticket. By contrast, outside a handful of areas where multiple neighbouring network affiliates are available, no more than three games may be aired in a given U.S. market on any Sunday afternoon (up to four games in week 17).

U.S. college football
Many ESPN College Football games are aired by TSN's feeds, including the regular season and most bowl games (which were, in the past, shared with Sportsnet 360, and not withstanding conflicts with other programming such as the World Junior Hockey Championship), and all College Football Playoff bowls. TSN also carries some of ESPN's studio programming, such as College GameDay.

Coverage of games is also available from U.S. networks carried or available for streaming in Canada:

 Big Ten Network: Big Ten Conference
 CBS Sports Network: Conference USA, Mountain West Conference
 Fox: Pac-12 Conference, Big Ten Conference, Big 12 Conference, Pac-12 Conference, and Mountain West Conference
 CBS: SEC
 NBC: Notre Dame home games
 Pac-12 Network: Pac-12 Conference
 Stadium: Conference USA, Mountain West Conference
 FloSports: New Mexico State

An out-of-market sports package offered by some providers includes other games from U.S. outlets that are not otherwise available in Canada (such as Fox Sports Networks, and ESPN games not picked up by the TSN channels). FloSports and Stadium also carry several FCS conferences such as Colonial Athletic Association, Gulf South Conference and Patriot League.

XFL
TSN and RDS: All games.

Hockey

National Hockey League
Rogers Communications is the sole national rightsholder of the NHL in Canada until the end of 2025–26 NHL season. Most national telecasts air on Sportsnet properties, and include, but are not limited to:

 Hockey Night in Canada: Exclusive national window for Canadian teams on Saturday nights, multiple games airing across CBC Television, Citytv, and Sportsnet channels.
 In rare circumstances, due to non-hockey programming conflicts, the Sportsnet regional channels may air different games. However, all four Sportsnet regional channels are available nationwide through the digital services of most providers.
 Scotiabank Wednesday Night Hockey; Exclusive national Wednesday-night game on Sportsnet.
 Rogers Monday Night Hockey: National Monday-night game on Sportsnet.
 Simulcasts of most-U.S. games from regional sports networks, NHL on ESPN, and NHL on TNT coverage (primarily on Wednesday nights), including TNT's new Sunday-afternoon games and the Winter Classic, as well as other outdoor games excluding the Heritage Classic.
 Stanley Cup Playoffs coverage; early rounds divided between CBC and Sportsnet. All games from the conference finals onward are simulcast by both networks.
 Canadian distribution and marketing rights to the NHL.tv (Rogers NHL Live) and NHL Centre Ice services, which carries out-of-market games and U.S. nationally televised games not aired by Sportsnet channels.
 Hockey Night in Canada: Punjabi Edition: Coverage of selected Hockey Night in Canada games with Punjabi language commentary on Omni Television.
 Since 2019, the Aboriginal Peoples Television Network (APTN) simulcasts selected Hometown Hockey games with commentary in the Plains Cree language.

French-language rights were sub-licensed to Quebecor Media; all coverage airs on TVA Sports. La super soirée LNH serves as the flagship broadcast on Saturday nights, typically featuring the Montreal Canadiens.

Regional
Canadian teams also contract with local or regional broadcasters for selected pre-season and regular season games not covered by the national contracts. These deals are separate from the national rights deal, and may cover up to 60 regular-season games per season. Rights are current as of the 2021–22 NHL season.
Vancouver Canucks: Sportsnet Pacific
Edmonton Oilers: Sportsnet West
Calgary Flames: Sportsnet West
Winnipeg Jets: TSN3
Toronto Maple Leafs: Sportsnet Ontario (16 games), TSN4 (26 games) (English)
 Rights to the Maple Leafs' regional telecasts are divided equally between TSN and Sportsnet (whose parent companies own a joint majority stake in the team's parent company). Of Sportsnet's 26 regional Leafs games, ten are broadcast nationally in conjunction with Rogers' national NHL rights, with Molson Canadian as presenting sponsor.
 The team-owned Leafs Nation Network airs replays and other ancillary coverage of the team.
Ottawa Senators: TSN5 and RDS/RDS2
Montreal Canadiens: TSN2 and RDS

Each team's regional game broadcasts are restricted to viewers of that team's designated home broadcast region as assigned by the NHL. Outside said region, these broadcasts are made available exclusively through NHL Centre Ice (TV) or Rogers NHL Live (streaming). If the originating channel is available outside a team's region (e.g. out-of-market Sportsnet feeds), the game broadcasts must be blacked out in these other areas. Sportsnet also operates part-time channels for the Canucks, Flames, and Oilers in case of scheduling conflicts: these channels are tied to the Sportsnet One licence. During the period that it held the rights, Sportsnet used City station CJNT as the overflow channel for Canadiens games instead.

Under previous (2002–14) rights deals with RDS, the Canadiens forwent a separate regional rights contract (at the time of its establishment, RDS was the only national French-language sports channel in Canada) and allowed all of its games to be broadcast nationally in French in conjunction with RDS's package. With the transition to TVA Sports as national rightsholder, the Canadiens chose to negotiate a 12-year regional rights deal with RDS (the team is partially owned by the channel's parent BCE Inc.) in the team's designated broadcast region.

U.S. teams in close proximity to the Canada–US border are now also able to sell Canadian regional broadcast rights to their games. As of the 2013–14 season, Bell Satellite TV and Bell Fibe TV own regional rights to Buffalo Sabres broadcasts for portions of Canada within a 50-mile radius of First Niagara Center, approximately stretching from Niagara Falls to the community of Stoney Creek in Hamilton. Sabres game broadcasts are available to Bell TV subscribers in this region at no extra cost, and moreover are no longer available as part of the NHL Centre Ice package through other providers serving this region. The Detroit Red Wings, whose market borders on Windsor, Ontario, is presumably able to sell similar rights but has not yet done so.

As with other sports properties, game broadcasts on U.S. terrestrial stations carried in Canada, such as the ABC broadcast network's national rights package.

Canadian Hockey League
As of the 2021–22 season, the national CHL package is divided between TSN and CBC Sports. Many regular-season games are aired locally by community channels.

 TSN and RDS hold rights to the Memorial Cup and other national CHL-organized events
 TSN will broadcast 30 national games from across the CHL's leagues.
 RDS will broadcast 20 national games from across the CHL's leagues.
 CBC Television will carry a package of six games on Saturday afternoons in October and November.
 CBC will stream a weekly "game of the week" package beginning in November.

Other events
TSN and RDS hold broadcast rights to national championships and most international events sanctioned by Hockey Canada, including but not limited to IIHF world championships, the Telus Cup (men's U18), Centennial Cup (men's junior A), Esso Cup (women's U18) and the Allan Cup (senior). In 2020, TSN renewed its rights through the 2033–34 season.
Spengler Cup: TSN
Champions Hockey League: TSN
American Hockey League: Toronto Marlies games are carried by Leafs Nation Network, and occasionally simulcast by TSN networks. Laval Rocket home games are carried by RDS. Sportsnet has historically broadcast the AHL All-Star Classic.

Horse racing
 U.S. triple crown (Kentucky Derby, Preakness Stakes, Belmont Stakes): TSN
 Canadian triple crown (Queen's Plate, Prince of Wales Stakes, Breeders' Stakes): TSN
 Breeders' Cup: TSN
 Pegasus World Cup: TSN
 Saudi Cup: TSN
 North America Cup: TSN
 Yearling Sales Night: TSN
 Woodbine Mile: TSN
 Natalma Stakes: TSN
 Canadian International Stakes: TSN
 Breeders Crown: TSN

Lacrosse 

 National Lacrosse League: TSN

Kickboxing
King of Kings: DAZN: October 2022 to October 2025, all fights
Glory: Fight Network

Mixed martial arts
Ultimate Fighting Championship: TSN and RDS
Bellator: Paramount+
Bushido MMA: DAZN:October 2022 to October 2025, all fights
CAGE MMA Finland: Fight Network
Cage Warriors: UFC Fight Pass
Combate Americas: Univision Canada
IBJJF Pan-American Championship: FloSports
KSW: Fight Network
Professional Fighters League: TSN

Motorsports

FIA 
Formula One: TSN (Sky F1's coverage), RDS, F1 TV Pro
Formula 2: TSN
Porsche Mobil 1 Supercup: TSN2 (Highlights)
WRC: Red Bull TV & WRC+
ERC: RDS2 (Highlights)
ABB Formula E: TSN

Stock car
TSN and RDS hold rights to the NASCAR Cup Series and Xfinity Series. It also airs coverage of NASCAR's Canadian circuit, the NASCAR Pinty's Series (with coverage usually aired in a pre-recorded format).
Fox Sports Racing generally carries practice and qualifying sessions (simulcast from FS1 or FS2 for events during Fox's half of the season. It also carries all NASCAR Truck Series races.

IndyCar
IndyCar Series: TSN

FIM
 MotoGP: REV TV Canada

International Motor Sports Association 
WeatherTech SportsCar Championship: Discovery Velocity (Live), TSN (highlights)
Ultra 94 Porsche GT3 Cup Challenge Canada by Yokohama: TSN, RDS2 (Highlights)

Other
W Series: TSN and RDS
 Extreme E: RDS

Multi-sport events
2020 Summer Olympics: CBC and Radio-Canada
 Coverage also simulcast on Sportsnet, TSN, and TVA Sports networks.

Professional Wrestling
WWE: Sportsnet 360 carries Raw and SmackDown, NXT and other ancillary programming (including WWE Vintage Collection and WWE Main Event). Rogers Media handles Canadian distribution of WWE Network.
All Elite Wrestling: TSN
Impact Wrestling: Fight Network, GameTV
New Japan Pro-Wrestling: The Roku Channel
Women of Wrestling: CHCH-DT / CHEK-DT

Rugby

Rugby Union

International
Rugby World Cup: TSN and RDS
The Rugby Championship: TSN
Six Nations Championship: DAZN
Rugby Europe Championship: FloSports
Pacific Nations Cup: TSN
World Rugby Sevens Series: CBC Sports

Club
Super Rugby: TSN
Gallagher Premiership: Sportsnet World
United Rugby Championship: Sportsnet World
Top14: Canal+ International
European Rugby Champions Cup: ECR TV
European Rugby Challenge Cup: ECR TV
Major League Rugby: TSN (Toronto Arrows), The Rugby Network (rest of league)

Rugby League
National Rugby League (Select matches): Sportsnet World
Super League (Select matches): Sportsnet World

Skiing
Alpine Skiing World Cup: CBC Sports
Alpine Skiing World Championships: CBC Sports

Soccer

Major League Soccer
Beginning with the 2023 season, Apple is the primary global rightsholder to Major League Soccer and the Leagues Cup through its MLS Season Pass streaming product, under a contract in effect until 2032.

From 2023 to 2026, Bell Media, through TSN and RDS, will simulcast coverage of at least one MLS match per week involving a Canadian club, as well as select playoff and Leagues Cup matches. Coverage of games aired by the Fox broadcast network will also be available to most Canadian TV service subscribers.

Canadian and North American soccer
CONCACAF Gold Cup: OneSoccer
CONCACAF Champions League: OneSoccer
CONCACAF League: OneSoccer
CONCACAF Nations League: OneSoccer
Leagues Cup: MLS Season Pass, TSN and RDS
Campeones Cup: TBD
Canadian Soccer Association-organized events, including national team FIFA World Cup Qualifiers: OneSoccer
Canadian Premier League: OneSoccer
Canadian Championship: OneSoccer

South American soccer
Copa America: TSN (2021)
Copa Libertadores: beIN Sports
Copa Sudamericana: beIN Sports
Recopa Sudamericana: beIN Sports
Argentine Primera División: Fanatiz
Argentine Primera B: Fanatiz
Campeonato Brasileiro Série A: Fanatiz
Campeonato Brasileiro Série B: Fanatiz
Colombian Liga Águila: Fanatiz
Chilean Primera División: TBD
Ecuadorian Serie A: GolTV Play
Peruvian Liga 1: GolTV Play, Fanatiz
Uruguayan Primera División: GolTV Play
Venezuelan Primera División: GolTV Play
Copa Argentina: Fanatiz
Copa Aguila: Fanatiz

International soccer
 FIFA tournament broadcast rights are held by Bell Media through 2026. The FIFA World Cup and Women's World Cup are split between CTV and TSN, with RDS carrying French-language coverage. 
 Other FIFA tournaments are generally carried by TSN and RDS.
FIFA Club World Cup: fuboTV
FIFA World Cup qualifiers:
CONCACAF: OneSoccer
CONMEBOL:
AFC: Select first and second round matches on Mycujoo
CAF: YouTube
 UEFA: DAZN
African Cup of Nations: beIN Sports
 International Champions Cup: DAZN
 Women's International Champion's Cup: DAZN

European soccer
UEFA European Championship: TSN (English), RDS (French) (finals), DAZN (qualifiers)
UEFA Nations League: DAZN
UEFA Champions League: DAZN
UEFA Europa League: DAZN
UEFA Super Cup: DAZN
UEFA Youth League: DAZN
UEFA Women's Champions League: DAZN
Premier League: FuboTV
La Liga: TSN and RDS
Segunda División: TSN and RDS, LaLiga Sports TV
Serie A: FuboTV, TLN
Supercoppa Italiana and Coppa Italia: FuboTV
DFL: Sportsnet
Bundesliga
Super Cup
DFB-Pokal: DAZN & YouTube
3. Liga: YouTube
Regionalliga: OneFootball
Ligue 1: beIN Sports (English and Spanish), OneSoccer (English language for Lille matches only), and TV5 (French)
Coupe de France: beIN Sports (English and Spanish), TV5 (French) (final only)
Trophée des Champions: beIN Sports (English and Spanish)
EFL Championship: DAZN
EFL League One: DAZN
EFL League Two: DAZN
FA Cup: Sportsnet
EFL Cup: DAZN
FA Community Shield: Sportsnet
FA Women's Super League: Sportsnet
Scottish Premiership: N/A
Primeira Liga: GolTV Play, GOLTV via Fanatiz
Turkish Super Lig: beIN Sports
Eredivisie: OneSoccer
Belgian Pro League: DAZN
Russian Premier League: YouTube
Austrian Bundesliga: OneFootball
NIFL Premiership: OneFootball
Swiss Super League: OneFootball
Czech First League, Slovak Super Liga,  Eliteserien, Danish Superliga: OneFootball

As with other sports properties, game broadcasts on U.S. terrestrial stations carried in Canada, such as selected Premier League games aired on the NBC broadcast network as part of NBC's U.S. rights package, are not subject to blackout for Canadians receiving those stations over-the-air or through a cable/satellite package.

Asian soccer
2023 AFC Asian Cup: Paramount+
AFC Champions League: Paramount+
J.League: YouTube via J.League International (live coverage for League cup and J2 matches only, with highlights for all three leagues and a league cup)
K League 1: OneFootball
A-League: OneFootball
FFA Cup: YouTube via My Football
Chinese Super League: OneSoccer
Indian Super League: OneFootball

Swimming
International Swimming League: CBC Sports
World Swimming Championships:  CBC Sports

Tennis
 TSN and RDS hold rights to all Grand Slams, as well as the ATP Tour (Masters 1000 and 500, excluding the Canadian Open)
ATP Finals: TSN and RDS
Canadian Open: Sportsnet and TVA Sports
ATP Cup: TSN and RDS
ATP Tour 250: TSN
Next Generation ATP Finals: TSN and RDS
WTA Finals: DAZN, TSN, TVA Sports
WTA 1000: DAZN, TSN, TVA Sports
WTA 500: DAZN, TVA Sports
WTA 250: DAZN
Fed Cup: Sportsnet and TVA Sports 
Davis Cup: Sportsnet and TVA Sports

References

Sports television in Canada
Canada